Obviation may refer to:
 A linguistic process involving the obviative (fourth person)
 Bypass (disambiguation)